Ahmed Benjelloun (– born in 1942 in Ain Bni Mathar, died on 1 February 2015 in Rabat) was a Moroccan politician and activist, mainly known as the founder and the former secretary general for the Socialist Democratic Vanguard Party.

Benjelloun was the younger brother of the assassinated political activist Omar Benjelloun. He was a member of the same party (National Union of Popular Forces) until 1983, where after major disagreements with the secretary general Abderrahim Bouabid, regarding participation in elections, he decided to leave and founded the Socialist Democratic Vanguard Party together with Abderrahman Benamrou. The new party boycotted all elections in Morocco until 2007. Later, it joined the Unified Socialist Party coalition which participated in Moroccan elections since then.

References

Moroccan dissidents
Moroccan politicians
1942 births
2015 deaths